Elphicke is a surname. Notable people with the surname include:

Charlie Elphicke (born 1971), British politician, former solicitor, and convicted criminal
Natalie Elphicke (born 1970), British politician and finance lawyer

See also
Elphick

Surnames of Old English origin